Xiangning County is a county in the southwest of Shanxi province, China, bordering Shaanxi province across the Yellow River to the west. It is under the administration of the prefecture-level city of Linfen.

History 
During the Spring and Autumn period, Marquis E of Jin lived in what is now present-day Xiangning County.

In the Warring States period, the area had been occupied by both the Han and Zhao states.

During the Northern Wei Dynasty, the area was initially named Changping, and was later changed to Pingchang. Eventually, the name was changed to Changning, but in 923 was changed to Xiangning, its present-day name.

From 1958 to 1961, Xiangning County was briefly merged with neighboring Ji County.

Geography 

38.2% of the county is forested.

Climate

Administrative divisions 
Xiangning County is divided into five towns and five townships. These are then divided into 182 village-level divisions.

Economy 
Said coal field is estimated to have 15.3 billion tons of coal in reserve.

Major agricultural products from Xiangning include Zanthoxylum, apples, walnuts, Chinese yams, and wine.

Transportation 
National Highway 209 and National Highway 309 both run through the county, as well as three provincial highways.

References

County-level divisions of Shanxi